The Comité Maghrébin de l'Electricité (COMELEC), also Maghreb Electricity Committee and North African Power Pool, is an association of five North African countries belonging to the Arab Maghreb Union (Union du Maghreb Arabe). The major aim of the association is to interconnect the electricity grids of the member countries in order to facilitate the trading of electric power between the members. North African Power Pool is one of the five regional power pools in Africa.

Overview
Member countries are Algeria, Libya, Mauritania, Morocco, and Tunisia. There are several other ongoing programs.

Members
The member countries and their respective electricity utility companies are listed in the table below.

See also

 Southern African Power Pool 
 Eastern Africa Power Pool
 West African Power Pool
 Central African Power Pool

References

External links
 Website of Arab Maghreb Union

Energy in Africa
Electricity markets